The Hong Kong Open is a golf tournament which is co-sanctioned by the Asian Tour and the European Tour. It was founded in 1959 and in 1962 was one of the five tournaments that made up the inaugural Far East Circuit, later known as the Asia Golf Circuit. It remained part of the circuit until 1996, before joining the Asian Tour, then known as the Omega Tour, in 1997. It became co-sanctioned by the European Tour in 2001, as part of the 2002 season.

The Hong Kong Open was played in spring from its inception until 1994, but since 1995 has usually been played towards the end of the year, in November or December, and as a result has often fallen into the following year's European Tour season.

Since taking its place on the European Tour the event has always been held at the Hong Kong Golf Club in Sheung Shui, New Territories. The Hong Kong Golf Association, Hong Kong PGA, and Chinese PGA receive a limited number of exemptions into the tournament for their members.

History
In 1958, Hong Kong Golf Club member Kim Hall wrote to Australian professional Eric Cremin to see if those players playing in the Philippine Open in 1959 would consider staying in the region to play in Hong Kong. Hall then approached Peter Plumley, secretary of South China Morning Post, who was also a golfer. Plumley then persuaded his boss to sponsor 1,000 Australian pounds in prize money in the name of South China Morning Post. Then, the first Hong Kong Open was launched in February 1959. According to Hong Kong Golf Club member Willie Woo, Kim Hall was very keen for the tournament and he talked a lot with Australian golfers, including Peter Thomson. Woo helped to get Taiwanese players through his connections.

The first tournament was hosted by Sir Robert Black, the then-Governor of Hong Kong. Around one thousand spectators joined the tournament. Taiwanese golfer Lu Liang-Huan won the inaugural edition of the tournament. The success of the Hong Kong Open prompted first Singapore in 1961, and then Malaysia and Japan in 1962, to introduce their own tournaments and bring about the setting up of the Far East Golf Circuit. The circuit further expanded into a regular ten-tournament tour, called the Asia Golf Circuit, that existed until the end of the twentieth century.
 
Despite the SCMP's original agreement to maintain 1,000 pounds sponsorship of the Hong Kong Open, it was felt that prize money would need to be increased if the best players were to be attracted. To that end the 1963 event was jointly sponsored by the SCMP and British American Tobacco, with the purse being increased to 4,000 pounds as a result.
 
Due to poor weather conditions during the 1966 event, the Hong Kong Golf Club lost HK$10,442 as the money put up by the sponsors was insufficient to cover expenses. As a result, the club decided that in future it could not undertake to assist financially in any way, but would continued provide the courses and the general facilities. The 1968 tournament was the first edition to be shown live on television. In 1969, the newly formed the Hong Kong Golf Association took up the task of organising the tournament. In 1971, the Hong Kong Open was on the verge of disappearing due to low spectator numbers and financial problems, but with the assistance of the Asia Pacific Golf Confederation, who were keen to retain the event on the Asia Golf Circuit, the tournament was saved.

In 1996, Hong Kong golfer Dominique Boulet finished fourth, the best result by a local golfer. In 2008, Florida-based Hong Kong amateur Shun Yat Hak became the youngest player ever to make the cut in a European Tour event, at 14 years and 304 days, eclipsing the record set by Sergio García at the Turespaña Open Mediterrania in 1995. At the other end of the age spectrum, Miguel Ángel Jiménez became the oldest golfer ever to win on the European Tour when he won in 2012 at age , and extended his record by defending his title in 2013 at age .

In 2013, organizers and potential sponsors raised concerns over the complex becoming enmeshed in a controversial redevelopment plan for Fan Ling. The tournament was played that year without a title sponsor.

In 2020, the Hong Kong Open organizers announced that the tournament will be postponed till 2021 due to COVID-19 restrictions.

Winners

Source:

Scorecard

Notes

References

External links

Coverage on the Asian Tour's official site
Coverage on the European Tour's official site

Asia Golf Circuit events
Asian Tour events
Former European Tour events
Golf tournaments in Hong Kong
Recurring sporting events established in 1959
1959 establishments in Hong Kong